Meletius III may refer to:

 Meletius III of Constantinople, Ecumenical Patriarch in 1845
 Meletius III of Athens